Domnic Joseph Muthuswami (born 9 March 1981) is an Indian cricketer of Tamil descent who plays for Maharashtra cricket team in domestic cricket and Delhi Daredevils in the Indian Premier League. He is a right-arm medium-fast bowler, who made his debut for Maharashtra at the age of 30. He worked in a bullet manufacturing company in Pune, before his bowling abilities were recognised while playing in the Industrial League. In 2011, he impressed the then Maharashtra coach Surendra Bhave and was selected in the Maharashtra Ranji squad later that year. In 2015, he was bought by the IPL franchise Delhi Daredevils for Rs. 75 lakh at the players auction. He made his IPL debut on 9 April 2015, playing for the Daredevils against the Chennai Super Kings.

References

External links

Living people
1981 births
Indian cricketers
Maharashtra cricketers
West Zone cricketers
Delhi Capitals cricketers
Cricketers from Pune
Tamil sportspeople